The Little Southeast Upsalquitch River is a tributary of the East bank of the Southeast Upsalquitch River, flowing entirely in the Balmoral Parish, in Restigouche County, in the Northwest of New Brunswick, in Canada.

Geography 
The Little Southeast Upsalquitch River rises at the foot (south side) of the Black Top Mountain in Restigouche County. This source is located in forested area:
  Northeast of the confluence of the "Little Upsalquitch East River";
  southwest of the confluence of the Upsalquitch Southeast River;
  southeast of the confluence of the Upsalquitch River;
  southeast of Campbellton bridge, crossing the Restigouche River.

From its source, the Little Southeast Upsalquitch River flows  in a small valley surrounded by high mountains, in the following segments:
  to Southwest, up to a bend of the river;
  westward up to Caribou Brook (from the north);
  westward up to Middle Brook;
  westward up to Red Brook;
  westward up to North Branch Brook Akroyd (from the West);
  to Southwest up to a stream (from the East);
  to Southwest, up to the confluence of the "Little Upsalquitch Southeast River".

The Little Southeast Upsalquitch River empties into a river curve on the East bank of the Southeast Upsalquitch River. The confluence of the Little Southeast Upsalquitch River is located at:
•  Southeast of the confluence of the Upsalquitch Southeast River;
•  Southeast of the confluence of the Upsalquitch River.

See also 

 
 Restigouche County
 Balmoral Parish
 List of rivers of New Brunswick
 Chaleur Bay
 Gulf of Saint Lawrence
 Restigouche River
 Upsalquitch River
 Upsalquitch Southeast River

References 

Rivers of New Brunswick
Canadian Heritage Rivers